Play Music Today, formerly known as Professional Music Technology and often shortened to PMT Online, PMT, or PMT Music, is a musical instrument retailer with stores across England and Wales. The warehouse, logistics, sales marketing and e-commerce teams are in Speke, Liverpool, with the original store located in Southend On Sea, UK. PMT's Birmingham location is the biggest music shop in the UK.

PMT’s online store offers a range of musical instruments including Guitars, Drums, Keyboards and PA systems along with a blog that provides information on newly released products, how-to guides and ‘Best Of’ instrument lists.

Play Music Today also has a YouTube channel reviewing new musical instruments and offering advice to musicians of all levels.

History 
The first PMT store was opened on 17 August 1991 in Southend On Sea, UK by owners Simon Gilson and Terry Hope under the holding company of S&T Audio. Since then, the company has expanded to 16 locations across the UK, selling musical instruments such as Guitars, Bass, Drums/Percussion, Keys, Vocal Solutions, PA, Studio/Recording equipment, DJ/Producer equipment and musical instrument accessories both in-store and online via their own website.

In May 2011, PMT acquired Liverpool-based Dolphin Music, continuing to trade under both names before closing Dolphin and merging the site with PMT Online in 2017.

In 2013, members of Radiohead and Supergrass helped stop PMT's Oxford location from being converted into a cafe and restaurant as part of a hotel development.

In March 2016, PMT acquired Nevada Music in Portsmouth, re-branding the existing Nevada Music store to PMT.

In 2016 PMT celebrated its 25th year of operation.

In 2022, PMT rebranded from Professional Music Technology to Play Music Today, with an emphasis on community, inclusivity, and making music available to all regardless of skill.

YouTube 
The Play Music Today YouTube channel, was started to provide viewers with information on current product reviews as well as ‘How To’ guides and ‘Best Of’ lists. PMTVUK now has over 140,000 subscribers (December 2019).

References

External links 
 
 YouTube Channel

Online retailers of the United Kingdom
Music retailers of the United Kingdom
English YouTubers
British companies established in 1991